Ján Jendek (5 July 1931 – 7 December 2002) was a Slovak ice hockey goaltender.

Jendek spent the majority of his career with HC Slovan Bratislava. He competed in the 1956 Winter Olympics for Czechoslovakia.

References

External links

1931 births
2002 deaths
Czechoslovak ice hockey goaltenders
HC Slovan Bratislava players
Ice hockey players at the 1956 Winter Olympics
Olympic ice hockey players of Czechoslovakia
Slovak ice hockey goaltenders
Ice hockey people from Bratislava